Palais Rohan may refer to:
Palais Rohan, Bordeaux
Palais Rohan, Strasbourg